Edward "Pat" Purdue (1878 – 16 July 1939) was a New Zealand rugby union player. A lock, Purdue represented Southland at a provincial level. He played just one match for the New Zealand national side, a test against the touring Australian team in 1905. Also appearing in that match was Purdue's brother, Charles, the pair becoming the first brothers to play in the same test for New Zealand.

Purdue died in Invercargill on 16 July 1939, and was buried at the city's Eastern Cemetery.

References

1878 births
1939 deaths
People from Dipton, New Zealand
New Zealand rugby union players
New Zealand international rugby union players
Southland rugby union players
Rugby union locks
Burials at Eastern Cemetery, Invercargill
Rugby union players from Southland, New Zealand